Tavan Dasht-e Sofla (also Romanized as Tavān Dasht-e Soflá and Tavāndasht-e Soflá; also known as Tavāndasht-e Pā’īn and Tawān Dasht) is a village in Malmir Rural District, Sarband District, Shazand County, Markazi Province, Iran. At the 2006 census, its population was 14, in 4 families.

References 

Populated places in Shazand County